The 2016 Chicago Red Stars season was the eighth season of the soccer club and its fourth season in National Women's Soccer League.

After a banner 2015 season, the team expected to do well again. The club ended the regular season at third place, and played the play-off semi-final at Boyds, Maryland against Washington Spirit on September 30, falling 2–1 and did not reach the championship match.

This season the Red Stars returned to Toyota Park for its home games, where it last played on a regular basis during its 2010 season in Women's Professional Soccer league. In 2016 season, the Red Stars honored the retirements of several long time members; Michelle Lomnicki, Julianne Sitch, Jackie Santacaterina, and Lori Chalupny. The jersey number 17 worn by Chalupny, a 3-year captain, an Olympic gold medalist and a FIFA world champion was retired in honor of her accomplishments.

After the season, National team coach Jill Ellis called up 5 Red Stars, Christen Press, Alyssa Naeher, Arin Gilliland, Casey Short and Danielle Colaprico to national team training camp. On October 7, NWSL announced the voting results of NWSL Best XI and NWSL Second XI; while Press and Gilliland were named to Best XI; 5 Red Stars, Naeher, Julie Johnston, Short, Colaprico and Vanessa DiBernardo were named to NWSL Second XI.

In the off-season 8 Red Stars, the highest number in team history, went to play in Australia on loan to W-League sides; Samantha Johnson to Melbourne Victory;
Jen Hoy and Arin Gilliland to Newcastle Jets;
Alyssa Mautz and Vannesa DiBernardo to Perth Glory;
and Katie Naughton, Danielle Colaprico and Sofia Huerta to Adelaide United.
Chicago Red Stars loaned the largest number of players to W-League, 4 more than any other NWSL club.

First-team squad
Roster
Players who are under contract to play for the club in 2016 NWSL season.

 

 (C)

College draft
Players selected by the club in 2016 NWSL College Draft.

Naughton, Gorden and Raetzman joined the Red Stars first team; Flaws, Jordan, C Johnson and Ellenwood joined the Red Stars Reserves team which competes in Women's Premier Soccer League. Janelle Flaws played for 45 minutes in NWSL regular season, in an away match against Washington on July 9.

Amateur call-up
Amateur players listed below were called up during the absence of international players training or playing for the national team at the 2016 Olympics or international friendly

Player movement

Management and staff
Front Office
 Owner Arnim Whisler
Coaching Staff
Manager Rory Dames
Assistant coach Bonnie Young
Assistant coach Brian Kibler
Assistant and Goalkeeper Coach Jordi King

Regular-season standings

Results summary

Results by Round

Match results

Preseason
On February 8 Chicago Red Stars announced its preseason schedule.

National Women's Soccer League

Regular season

Postseason playoff

NWSL awards

Squad statistics
Source: NWSL

Squad statistics are of regular season matches only

Key to positions: FW - Forward, MF - Midfielder, DF - Defender, GK – Goalkeeper

Chicago Red Stars team awards
On October 5 Chicago Red Stars announced the winners of 2016 team awards. For the third time in 3 years Julie Johnston was the recipient of the award for Defensive Most Valuable Player. For second consecutive year, Christen Press was named the Most Valuable Player, and Vanessa DiBernardo the Unsung Hero. New Red Star Alyssa Naeher, with 75% save percentage, was named the Iron Women of Character, while another new Red Star Casey Short was named the Rookie of the Year.

Team Most Valuable Player
Christen Press (received this same award in second consecutive year)

Defensive Most Valuable Player
Julie Johnston  (received this same award in third consecutive year)

Rookie of the Year
Casey Short

Unsung Hero
Vanessa DiBernardo (received this same award in second consecutive year)

Iron Woman of Character
Alyssa Naeher

Images

References

Match reports (preseason)

Match reports (regular season)

Match report (postseason playoff)

Notes

2016
Chicago Red Stars
Chicago Red Stars
Chicago Red Stars